The Warden is a 2019 Iranian mystery drama film directed and written by Nima Javidi. It stars Navid Mohammadzadeh and Parinaz Izadyar. Set in 1967 in Iran, Navid Mohammadzadeh plays Major Nemat Jahed, the warden of a prison, that is being evacuated for expansion whilst one of the prisoners is missing. The film is titled after the prisoner's nickname "Ahmad Redskin".

This film was screened for the first time in the 37th Fajr Film Festival, and by being nominated in 8 categories of this festival, Crystal Simorgh has been awarded a special prize by the jury. Massoud Farasati in his show (Seven) considered this film as the best work of the festival.

Plot
In 1967, an old prison in the south was evacuated due to its proximity to the city's developing airport. Major Nemat Jahed, the head of the prison, is transferring the prisoners to the new prison with his officers, and the major himself and his men are scheduled to leave the prison by evening. Colonel Modaber, who is superior to Jahed, goes to him in prison and says that Jahed has been promoted and is going to be his own successor. Jahed, happy to hear the news, finds out during a phone call that one of the prisoners, Ahmed, nicknamed the Indian, was not with the other prisoners. Subsequent investigations assure Jahed that the Indian is in prison and hiding somewhere. At the same time, a prison warden named Susan Karimi came to see Jahed and told him that the Indian sentence had changed suspiciously from imprisonment to death. Jahed, who sees his promotion in jeopardy, searches the entire prison with his troops to find the Indians. Meanwhile, Jahed falls in love with one of the girls who helps the prisoners…

Cast

Soundtrack

The film's score is composed by Ramin Kousha, who is also the pianist. It was released on July 5, 2019.
 Last Day in Jail
 Countdown
 Time to Leave This Place
 Ultimatum
 Pieces from the Whole
 Looking Everywhere for Him
 Gas Attack
 Aftermath
 Losing Consciousness
 Dead End
 We Know Everything Now
 Suspicion
 Light & Darkness
 Circles
 One More Time
 Free Him

Release 
The Warden was screened for the first time, on Friday, February 1, 2019, in the Simorgh Soda section of the 37th Fajr International Film Festival, and was released in cinemas across the country on June 5, 2019. The Warden are now the fourth best-selling non-comedy film in the history of Iranian cinema.

Screens, Attending festivals and Awards

Screenings and festivals

Internal

Awards

Other awards

International nominations

References

External links
 
 

2019 thriller drama films
2019 films
Crystal Simorgh for Audience Choice of Best Film winners
Iranian drama films
2010s Persian-language films
Films about prison escapes
2010s mystery films
2010s prison drama films
Films about capital punishment
2010s historical romance films
Films directed by Nima Javidi